Çaparlı (also, Chaparly) is a village and municipality in the Shamkir Rayon of Azerbaijan.  It has a population of 1,587.

References 

Populated places in Shamkir District